Farimah Farjami (born May 8, 1952) is an Iranian actress. She has received various accolades, including a Crystal Simorgh for The Last Act (1991). Her acting in films, especially in independent women's dramas, has been repeatedly criticized by critics. She is often referred to as one of the leading actors of her generation.

Career

Her performances in the roles of wandering and wavering young or middle age women who struggle with psychological and personal problems were admired by film critics, and won awards for The Lead (1988, Masoud Kimiai), The Last Act (1990, Varouj Karim-Masihi), and Nargess (1992, Rakhshan Bani Etemad) from International Fajr Film Festival.

References

External links

1952 births
Living people
People from Tehran
Actresses from Tehran
Iranian film actresses
Iranian stage actresses
Iranian television actresses
Crystal Simorgh for Best Actress winners